= Latics =

Latics is a nickname for the following English football clubs:

- Oldham Athletic A.F.C.
- Wigan Athletic F.C.
